Duncan Burns is a male retired British wrestler.

Wrestling career
Burns represented England and won a silver medal in the 48 kg light-flyweight division, at the 1986 Commonwealth Games in Edinburgh, Scotland.

References

Living people
British male sport wrestlers
Wrestlers at the 1986 Commonwealth Games
Commonwealth Games silver medallists for England
Year of birth missing (living people)
Commonwealth Games medallists in wrestling
Medallists at the 1986 Commonwealth Games